{{safesubst:#invoke:RfD||2=.test (international domain name)|month = March
|day =  9
|year = 2023
|time = 09:34
|timestamp = 20230309093434

|content=
REDIRECT List of Internet top-level domains#Test TLDs 

}}